The False Code is a lost 1919 American silent drama film directed by Ernest C. Warde and produced by and starring Frank Keenan. It was distributed by Pathé Exchange.

Cast
Frank Keenan as John Benton
Miles McCarthy as Henry Vance
Joseph J. Dowling as Daniel Grey
Clyde Benson as Oscar Curtin
Ed Brady as Chicago Ed (*Edward J. Brady)
T. D. Crittenden as District Attorney
Helene Sullivan as Mrs. Benton
Irene Yeager as- Anne Benton
Jean Calhoun as Anne Benton
Pell Trenton as Jim Grey

Preservation status
The film is lost with a fragment surviving at the BFI National Film and Television Archive.

References

External links

1919 films
American silent feature films
American black-and-white films
Pathé Exchange films
Films directed by Ernest C. Warde
1919 drama films
Silent American drama films
1910s American films